Chymomyza fuscimana is a species of fly in the family Drosophilidae. It is found in the  Palearctic.

References

External links
Images representing Chymomyza fuscimana at BOLD

Drosophilidae
Insects described in 1838
Diptera of Europe
Taxa named by Johan Wilhelm Zetterstedt